Amalgamated Society of Railway Servants v Osborne [1910] AC 87 is a UK labour law case, which ruled that it was unlawful (ultra vires - beyond their legal powers) for trade unions to use funds raised from their subscriptions for political purposes (including funding the Labour Party or Labour candidates).

Facts
Osborne, a member of the Amalgamated Society of Railway Servants for 16 years in Walthamstow alleged that the union's creation of a political fund to support the Labour Representation Committee in elections was done irregularly in breach of union procedure. The original rules, from 1900, contained no reference to seeking Parliamentary representation. Because of the irregularity, it was argued that the donations by the union were ultra vires and void.

Judgment

House of Lords
The House of Lords held that a union’s authority was circumscribed by the union’s rules. Use of union funds for any purpose other than those enumerated in the union rules was ultra vires.

Court of Appeal
After bringing his action, Mr Osborne was expelled from the union. He brought a further claim that his expulsion was wrongful. The Court of Appeal held that he was wrongfully excluded. Lord Cozens-Hardy MR noted that the union was, at common law, a lawful association.

Significance

The judgment threatened one of the Labour party's main funding sources. This was especially detrimental to the Labour Party as its supporters were generally poorer than other political parties. The two elections in 1910 saw Labour gain 40 seats and 42 seats respectively. In 1911 H. H. Asquith's government decided, for the first time, that MPs should receive a salary. (Previously, only people with savings or funding organizations behind them could become Members of Parliament.) David Lloyd George, the Chancellor of the Exchequer gave MPs a wage of £400 per annum, which alleviated financial problems.

The Osborne judgment was overturned in 1913 by the Trade Union Act 1913, which confirmed the lawfulness of union political funds, but which compromised by giving members the choice to opt out of paying into them. The Trade Disputes and Trade Unions Act 1927 required union members to opt into the political fund. The Trade Disputes and Trade Unions Act 1946 repealed the 1927 Act and again required that members opt out. Currently under TULRCA 1992 s 82, members have the right to not contribute to a political fund, not be discriminated against for it, and the right to complain to the Certification Officer.

See also
UK labour law
Trade Union Act 1913
Trade Disputes and Trade Unions Act 1927
Trade Disputes and Trade Unions Act 1946
TULRCA 1992 s 82

Notes

External links
 The Osborne Judgement of 1909: Trade Union funding of political parties in historical perspective
 The Osborne Judgement

1909 in the United Kingdom
British trade unions history
1909 in British law
1909 in case law
1909 in labor relations
House of Lords cases
United Kingdom trade union case law
Political funding in the United Kingdom
Railway litigation in 1909